These are the international rankings of the :

Culture

Economy

International Monetary Fund: Income per capita in purchasing power parity ranked 1 out of 182 (2009)
United Nations Development Programme:  Human Development Index ranked 24 out of 169 (2010)
 Gallup World Poll: happiness  ranked 28 out of 155 (2009)
World Economic Forum: Global Competitiveness Report ranked 20 out of 133 (2010-2011)

Military

Institute for Economics and Peace: Global Peace Index ranked 7 out of 149 (2010)

Politics

Transparency International: Corruption Perceptions Index ranked  11 out of 178 (2010)
Reporters Without Borders: Press Freedom Index ranked 14 out of 178 (2010)
The Economist:  Democracy Index ranked  9 out of 167 (2008)

See also

Communications in Luxembourg
Education in Luxembourg
Geography of Luxembourg
Geology of Luxembourg
Demographics of Luxembourg
Government of Luxembourg
Foreign relations of Luxembourg
Law of Luxembourg
Military of Luxembourg
Prostitution in Luxembourg

References

Luxembourg